Ören may refer to:

Places

Turkey
 Ören, Acıpayam, a neighbourhood of Acıpayam, a town and a rural district in Denizli Province
 Ören, Bartın, a village in the district of Bartın, Bartın Province
 Ören, Besni, a village in the district of Besni, Adıyaman Province
 Ören, Bilecik, a village in the district of Bilecik, Bilecik Province
 Ören, Boyabat, a village in the district of Boyabat, Sinop Province
 Ören, Cumayeri, a village in the district of Cumayeri, Düzce Province
 Ören, Fethiye, a village in the district of Fethiye, Muğla Province
 Ören, Kuyucak, a village in the district of Kuyucak, Aydın Province
 Ören, Mersin, a town in the district of Anamur, Mersin Province
 Ören, Refahiye, a town in the district of Refahiye, Erzincan Province
 Ören, Silifke, a village in district of Silifke, Mersin Province, Turkey
 Ören, Yeniçağa, a village in the district of Yeniçağa, Bolu Province

Elsewhere
 Ören Nature Reserve, Nynäshamn Municipality, Stockholm County, Sweden

People with the surname
 Adem Ören (born 1979), Turkish basketball player
 Ahmet Mücahid Ören (born 1972), Turkish businessman
 Ayşe Ören (born 1980), Turkish female designer and sculptor
 Enver Ören (1939–2013), Turkish businessman
 Sinan Ören (born 1987), Turkish footballer
 Tuncer Ören (born 1935), Turkish-Canadian computer scientist

See also 
 Oren (disambiguation)